Thayaht was the pseudonym of artist and designer Ernesto Michahelles (1893–1959) best known for his revolutionary design of the TuTa and his involvement with the Italian Futurist movement.

Early life
A mixture of British, German, Swiss and American origins, Thayaht was born in Florence, Italy and was related to American artist Hiram Powers. He studied painting at the Académie Ranson in Paris, as well as scientific dyes and dynamic structure at Harvard University. He adopted the pseudonym "THAYAHT" around 1919; when written entirely in uppercase letters, it is a “bifrontal” palindrome, meaning it's visually symmetrical and can be read from right to left, left to right, and as its own reflection.

Career

In 1919, Thayaht started designing his most famous piece. The TuTa, which Thayaht called “the most innovative, futuristic garment ever produced in the history of Italian fashion” was an early example of what we now know as a jumpsuit. It was intended to revolutionize fashion and create a modern and particularly Italian style. With help from his artist brother RAM (Ruggero Alfredo Michahelles) he launches the new design in 1920, and the pattern is published by the newspaper La Nazione so that the TuTa is accessible to all. Intended as a practical item of clothing for everyday use, it was instead adopted as a fad by high Florentine society.

From 1919 to 1925, Thayaht worked as a designer in collaboration with Madeleine Vionnet, the couturière credited with introducing the bias-cut to Parisian fashion. He started out by designing the logo for the Maison Vionnet, and quickly became responsible for the graphic presentation of her new models, many published in the magazine Bon Ton. Thayaht also developed numerous patterns for printing on fabric that Vionnet used for her dresses, and designed some original models, including Paysage.

After returning to Italy, during the 1920s he continued his career in the applied arts. Pioneer of Industrial Design, he not only exhibited samples of fabric and clothing but also top quality furniture and furnishings at the 1923 and 1927 Esposizione Internazionale d'Arti Decorative di Monza. These were also intended for mass distribution. He tried his hand at jewelry design inventing "taiattite", a silver and aluminium alloy from which he made primitive fashionable pendants.

During the 1930s he showed at the first Roman Quadrennial (1931), organized the Futurist Exhibition of Painting, Sculpture, Paintings of Airplanes and Decorative Arts at the "Galleria d'Arte" in Florence, showing at the Venice Biennials 1932 to 1936 and at the Milan Triennial in 1933 and 1936.

Like many futurist artists during the 30s, Thayaht was at some point a supporter of fascist dictator Benito Mussolini: His famous painting "Il grande Nocchiere" (The great Helmsman) depicts an almost robot-like, muscular figure of Mussolini, holding the giant steering wheel of some fantastic craft, while in the sky above him, a long line of Savoia Marchetti S 55 Catamaran seaplanes (of the type used by air Marshal Italo Balbo for his propaganda transatlantic flights) soars into a sky crisscrossed by barbed wires. His work was also part of the sculpture event in the art competition at the 1936 Summer Olympics.

Later life
In the mid-1930s he retired to Marina di Pietrasanta, where he concentrated on studying science and astronomy and after the end of WWII founded the CIRNOS (independent station for the recording of space information) with the aim of recording and providing proof of UFOs.

Death
He is buried in the Cimitero Evangelico degli Allori in the southern suburb of Florence, Galluzzo (Italy).

References

Sources 
 Chiara Lastrucci, ed. Thayaht, un artista alle origine del Made in Italy. Prato: Museo del Tessuto Edizioni. 2007.
 Mauro Pratesi. Futurismo e Bon Ton, I Fratelli Thayaht e Ram. Gabinetto Disegni e Stampe degli Uffizi. Florence: Leo S. Olschki Editore. 2005
 Scappini, Alessandra, ed. Thayaht, Vita, scritti, carteggi. Museo di Arte Moderna e Contemporanea di Trento e Rovereto. Milano: Skira. 2005.
 Daniela Fonti, ed. Thayaht, Futurista irregolare. Museo di Arte Moderna e Contemporanea di Trento e Rovereto. Milano: Skira. 2005.
 Chirella Caterina e Uzzani Giovanna. Per il Sole e Contro il Sole, Thayaht & Ram, La Tuta/Modelli per Tessuti. Galleria del Costume di Palazzo Pitti. Livorno: Sillabe. 2003.
 Crispoleti, Enrico, ed. Il Futurismo attraverso la Toscana, architettura, arti visivi, letteratura, musica, cinema e teatro. Museo Civico di Livorno. Livorno: Silvana Editoriale. 2000
 Richard Martin. Cubism and Fashion. The Metropolitan Museum of Art. New York: Abrams, Inc. 1998.

1893 births
1959 deaths
Fashion designers from Florence
Italian people of British descent
Italian people of German descent
Italian people of Swiss descent
Italian people of American descent
Artists from Florence
Harvard University alumni
Olympic competitors in art competitions